Rätan is a locality situated in Berg Municipality, Jämtland County, Sweden with 168 inhabitants in 2005.

References 

Populated places in Berg Municipality
Jämtland